War Eagle Cove is an unincorporated community in Brush Creek Township, Washington County, Arkansas, United States. The Cove is located on the War Eagle Creek arm of Beaver Lake.

References

Unincorporated communities in Washington County, Arkansas
Unincorporated communities in Arkansas